Helen Stevenson may refer to:

 Helen Stevenson Meyner (1929–1997), U.S. Representative from New Jersey
 Helen Stevenson (artist), Scottish artist